Beecher may refer to:

People
Beecher (surname)

Places

United States
Beecher, Illinois
Beecher, Michigan, a census-designated place and unincorporated community near Flint
Beecher, Wisconsin, a town
Beecher (community), Wisconsin, an unincorporated community
Beecher Lake, Wisconsin, an unincorporated community
Beecher Island, along the Arikaree River in Colorado

Other places
 Beecher, Queensland, Australia, a locality in the Gladstone Region

Entertainment
Little John Beecher and His Orchestra
Beecher (band), from Manchester, England

See also
Beecher's (disambiguation)